Love of My Life is a 2020 Philippine television drama series broadcast by GMA Network. It premiered on the network's Telebabad line up and worldwide via GMA Pinoy TV from February 3, 2020 to March 19, 2021, replacing One of the Baes.

Series overview

Episodes

References

Lists of Philippine drama television series episodes